Herman Miller may refer to:

Herman Miller, officially MillerKnoll, Inc., U.S. manufacturer of office furniture and equipment
Herman Miller (Wisconsin politician) (1833-1922), American politician and businessman
Herman Miller (writer) (1919–1999), Hollywood writer and producer

Miller, Herman